Vangueria cinnamomea is a species of flowering plant in the family Rubiaceae. It is endemic to Namibia. The epithet is a Latin adjective meaning cinnamon-coloured.

References

External links 
 World Checklist of Rubiaceae

Endemic flora of Namibia
cinnamomea
Taxa named by Kurt Dinter